Rhodacaridae is a family of mites in the order Mesostigmata.

Genera

 Afrodacarellus Hulbutt, 1974
 Afrogamasellus Loots & Ryke, 1968
 Binodacarus Castilho & Moraes, 2010
 Interrhodeus Karg, 2000 
 Mediorhodacarus Shcherbak, 1976
 Minirhodacarellus Shcherbak, 1980
 Multidentorhodacarus Karg, 2000
 Paragamasellevans Loots & Ryke, 1968
 Pararhodacarus Jordaan, Loots & Theron, 1988
 Pennarhodeus Karg, 2000
 Poropodalius Karg, 2000
 Protogamasellopsis Evans & Purvis, 1987
 Rhodacarellus Willmann, 1935
 Rhodacaropsis Willmann, 1935
 Rhodacarus Oudemans, 1902

Habitat
Rhodacaridae live in soil and dead organic matter on soil, as well as in mosses, lichens and rodent nests.

References

 
Acari families